Trevor Bowring (8 November 1887 – 7 August 1908) was an English first-class cricketer.

The son of George Edward Bowring, he was born at Long Ditton in November 1887. He attended the prepratory school of The Reverend Henry Tindall near Hastings, where he learnt to play cricket. From there he proceeded to Rugby School, before going up to Exeter College, Oxford. While studying at Oxford, Bowring played first-class cricket for Oxford University, making his debut against Lancashire at Oxford in 1907. He played first-class cricket for Oxford until 1908, making a further sixteen appearances. He scored 772 runs in his seventeen first-class appearances, averaging 24.06. He had one innings of note, when he scored 228 against the Gentlemen of England in 1907, which included thirty fours and a single six and contributed toward an opening stand of 338 with Hugh Teesdale. With his slow bowling, Bowring took 20 wickets at a bowling average of 26.75 and best figures of 3 for 10. A cricketer of great promise, he would have undoubtedly featured for Oxford in the 1909 season, had it not been for his death from blood poisoning in August 1908. His cousin was the cricketer Wilfred Stoddart.

References

External links

1887 births
1908 deaths
People from Long Ditton
People educated at Rugby School
Alumni of Exeter College, Oxford
English cricketers
Oxford University cricketers
Deaths from sepsis